1. Division may refer to:

Sport
 Cypriot First Division, football
 Danish 1st Division, football
 FFHG Division 1, French ice hockey
 Luxembourg 1. Division, football
 1. divisjon, Norwegian handball level 2
 Norwegian First Division, football

Military
 1st Division (disambiguation)